Frederick Sylvester Hird (December 6, 1879 – September 27, 1952) was an American sports shooter who won one gold and two bronze medals at the 1912 Summer Olympics in Stockholm, Sweden.

Hird started as a professional boxer and semiprofessional baseball player, but in 1900 decided to pursue a military career and joined the Iowa National Guard. After competing at the 1912 Olympics he fought in the Mexican border campaign of 1914 and in World War I. From 1928 to 1936 he served as U.S. Marshall for southern Iowa and then as a special agent for the Iowa attorney general’s office, until retiring in 1943 as a lieutenant colonel.

References

External links

1879 births
1952 deaths
People from New Diggings, Wisconsin
American male sport shooters
United States Distinguished Marksman
ISSF rifle shooters
Shooters at the 1912 Summer Olympics
Shooters at the 1920 Summer Olympics
Olympic gold medalists for the United States in shooting
Olympic bronze medalists for the United States in shooting
Medalists at the 1912 Summer Olympics
19th-century American people
20th-century American people